Mike Martin (born May 6, 1974) is an American guitarist, composer and producer, also known by his nickname, "2 of 5". He has worked with such bands and artists as Stuck Mojo, The Duke, Fozzy & is currently working on/with: The Mike Martin Band, Agent Cooper and The Nominees.

Early life
Mike Martin began his life on stage, literally. Mike's mother was pregnant while she was in college studying and performing opera. He began his formal study of music at the age of four, learning violin and singing in choir throughout elementary school. At nine, he started playing the piano. In 1985, he discovered the guitar and was given one that year for Christmas. Teaching himself to play by ear, Mike quickly developed a repertoire of popular rock music, learning every AC/DC riff he could.

In junior high, Mike began seeking out teachers who could help further him along as a player. After a short stint with music store lessons, Mike was accepted to study at The Concord Community Music School in Concord, New Hampshire, studying Classical Guitar with Christopher Kane and Jazz Guitar with David Tonkin.

Early career
Mike earned his first professional job as a musician playing 12-string guitar for the New Life Singers, a contemporary Christian folk ensemble based out of Concord. At fifteen, Mike started a rock band and began performing music by Metallica, Queensrÿche, Anthrax, Guns N' Roses, Judas Priest and Iron Maiden all over New Hampshire with musicians who were already out of school.

Eager to learn as much as possible about the guitar, Mike took an opportunity to move to Myrtle Beach, South Carolina, in 1990 to begin studying with Tom Yoder, a local guitar wizard that Mike credits for bringing out the discipline and skills he would need for a lifetime of music achievement. During this period, Mike continued performing in the Myrtle Beach area with local bands. He stayed under Tom's tutelage until graduating from high school in 1992.

After high school, Mike moved to Atlanta with the group Tunnel Vision in hopes of getting his performing career off the ground. The new Alternative and Grunge movements made it difficult for Mike to secure many opportunities, but he did make some acquaintances along the way. During a short stint at a Georgia landscaping company he met Rich Ward of Stuck Mojo, and Sean Delson and Doug Busbee of Salem Ash. Little did he realize then the significance of this brief encounter.

Discouraged by the trend in "anti-guitar-solo" music, Mike did the only thing he could think of: Go To College! Here he studied Music Theory and Composition with Dr. David Maves, ASCAP Composer of the Year 1995. He also continued his Classical guitar studies with Mark Regnier and Jazz studies with pianist Tommy Gill.

After graduating in 1999, Mike moved back to Atlanta to pick up where he had left off. He soon found work in the thriving Atlanta Blues Scene as a mercenary sideman for hire which gained him the honor of being included in a historic photo of GA blues musicians now on display in The Georgia Music Hall of Fame in Macon, GA. Mike also had great success performing with his Nuevo Gypsy/Flamenco duo with Ed Wier. Mike began showcasing his writing with the group The Hybrids in 2000, which ultimately led to starting a group under his own name in 2002.

Fozzy
Mike was approached by Sean Delson in the summer of 2004 on behalf of Rich Ward and Fozzy to take over lead guitar responsibilities. They were in the process of dropping the joke gimmick to become a real band and beginning a world tour to support their record "All That Remains" featuring guitar solos by Hard Rock and Metal guitar heroes Zakk Wylde, Mark Tremonti and Marty Friedman. They were in need of a real guitar player to do the album justice on the road and Mike was more than up to the challenge, transcending "touring sideman" status to become a feature of the live shows. Since then Mike has toured worldwide with FOZZY and recorded The Duke's (Ward's) release on Spitfire Records, "My Kung Fu Is Good" (released worldwide May 2005). In 2006, Mike played lead guitar for Fozzy on the track "Metal Gods" for a tribute to Judas Priest CD featuring Motörhead, Vince Neil, Sepultura and Tim "Ripper" Owens among others.

Being in close association with the band Stuck Mojo, Mike was asked to perform on their long-awaited album "Southern Born Killers". After having toured with the band multiple times and appearing as a guest in the upcoming DVD release "Live at the London Underworld", Mike joined the band as an official member and second guitarist to Rich Ward in 2007, appearing in the music video for "I'm American". During Mike's time with Stuck Mojo, they toured extensively throughout Europe with Vol Beat and Ektomorph, as well as signed with Napalm Records to release "The Great Revival" in January 2009.

2009 also finally saw the release of the live CD which had been recorded in Australia on Fozzy's 2005 Remains Alive tour. Mike's final contribution to the band was to produce the track Wormwood, for the January 2010 release Chasing the Grail. Chris Jericho penned the lyrics about the end of the world inspired by the Book of Revelation. Mike turned those lyrics into a 14-minute progressive hard rock cinematic feast for the ears composing, arranging, engineering, playing all of the guitars, conducting the choir for the finale and co-mixing with Eric Frampton. This standout track was a complete musical departure for the band and it demonstrates Mike's growth as an artist in his own right. Wormwood has been a very highly reviewed track on the album and a fan favorite  but more importantly, it is a synergistic example of all that Mike has to offer and a tip of the hand as to what he will be up to on his next projects.

During his tours of duty with Fozzy, The Duke, and Stuck Mojo, Mike seized upon the opportunity to build a project studio at his home so he could begin to produce his solo projects. The first of which was the instrumental album "2 of 5", originally released the Summer of 2006 independently on Serpa Records, and now available worldwide through Steve Vai's Digital Nations Division of the Favored Nations record label. "The title is a reference to the Borg character '7 of 9' on Star Trek", says Mike. "I am the second of five children so I thought it was pretty clever". With the new Vai DN partnership, and the critical acclaim and success of "Wormwood", 2010 is poised to be the year Mike gets his band touring properly as well as working on a new solo album set to be released early in 2012.

Post Fozzy
In 2011, Mike has joined musical forces with Atlanta projects Agent Cooper (featuring members of Fozzy, Stuck Mojo, The Duke and Salem Ash) and The Nominees (featuring members of doubleDrive and Speed X). Both projects are expected to release new music before 2012.

Personal life
Mike's foundations in Classical, Metal, Jazz, Folk, Rock and World music have allowed him dedicate his career to versatility and culture with the highest respect for art by any means necessary. Perhaps he is best described in the following way: Art with a purpose is a force to be reckoned with.

Discography

Stuck Mojo
 Southern Born Killers (2008)
 The Great Revival  (2009)

Agent Cooper
 From The Ashes (EP) (2012)

Fozzy
 All That Remains Reloaded (2008)
 Chasing the Grail (2010)
 Remains Alive (2011)

Solo
 Mike Martin 2of5 (2005/2010)

Guest appearance
 Hell Bent Forever: A Tribute to Judas Priest (2008)
 Zero Chance – "Better Days for Broken Hearts" (2006)
 My Kung Fu Is Good (2005)
 Ed Wier – "Tribe" (2000)

References

External links
 

1974 births
Living people
American male composers
21st-century American composers
Fozzy members
Progressive rock guitarists
Place of birth missing (living people)
Musicians from Atlanta
Guitarists from Georgia (U.S. state)
Stuck Mojo members
American male guitarists